Mustafa Zaidi (born Syed Mustafa Hasnain Zaidi; 10 October 1930 – 2 October 1970) was a Pakistani Urdu poet and a civil servant.

Early life
In 1954, he passed the competitive examination and was sent to England for training before being given the posts of deputy commissioner and deputy secretary.

He married Vera Zaidi, a German, with whom he had a son and a daughter.

In June 1970, he was dismissed from civil service along with 38 other CSP officers by dictatorial regime of President General Agha Mohammad Yahya Khan. 

He died on 12 October 1970, two days after his 40th birthday, in Karachi under mysterious circumstances.

Literary works 
He also wrote under his pen-name Tegh Allahabadi. His initial poetry was romantic in nature. At the age of 17, published his first collection of poetry Zanjeeren in 1949, followed by, Zangeerein (1949), Roshni (1950), Shehr-e-Azar (City of Idol Worshippers; 1958), Mauj Meri Sadaf Sadaf (1960), Gareban (1964), Qaba-e-Saaz (1967) and Koh-e-Nida (1971) (published posthumously). His complete work was published as Kulliyaat-i-Mustafa Zaidi posthumously.

Further reading

See also
 List of unsolved deaths
 List of Urdu Poets

References

External links 
  – Andhi Chali
  – Dard e dil bhi
  – Kisi Aur Gham mein
 

1930 births
1970 deaths
20th-century Pakistani male writers
20th-century Pakistani poets
Government College University, Lahore alumni
Muhajir people
Pakistani civil servants
Pakistani male poets
Pakistani Shia Muslims
Recipients of Tamgha-e-Quaid-e-Azam
Academic staff of the University of Peshawar
Unsolved deaths
Urdu-language poets from Pakistan
Writers from Allahabad
Twelvers